The Hawaiian tropical dry forests are a tropical dry broadleaf forest ecoregion in the Hawaiian Islands. These forests are either seasonal or sclerophyllous. Dominant tree species include koa (Acacia koa), koaia (A. koaia), akoko (Euphorbia spp.), ōhia lehua (Metrosideros polymorpha), lonomea (Sapindus oahuensis), māmane (Sophora chrysophylla), loulu (Pritchardia spp.), lama (Diospyros sandwicensis), olopua (Nestegis sandwicensis), wiliwili (Erythrina sandwicensis), and iliahi (Santalum spp.). Endemic plant species in the dry forests include hau heleula (Kokia cookei), uhiuhi (Caesalpinia kavaiensis), and Gouania spp. The palila (Loxioides bailleui), a Hawaiian honeycreeper, is restricted to this type of habitat.

Prehistoric dry forests
The plant composition of Hawaii's dry forests has changed rather dramatically since the arrival of Polynesians, excluding the deliberate introduction of non-native species.  Fossilized pollen has shown that loulu (Pritchardia spp.) forests with an understory of Ka palupalu o Kanaloa (Kanaloa kahoolawensis) and aalii (Dodonaea viscosa) existed on the islands' leeward lowlands from at least before 1210 B.C. until 1565 A.D.  Populations of loulu and aalii still exist in diminished form, while only two Ka palupalu o Kanaloa specimens have ever been seen in the wild.

Maui

The Auwahi Dryland Forest Restoration Project has produced a substantial forest on the slopes of Haleakala on the island of Maui.

See also
 Oceanian realm
 Tropical and subtropical dry broadleaf forests
 Hawaiian tropical rainforests
 Hawaiian tropical low shrublands
 Hawaiian tropical high shrublands
List of ecoregions in the United States (WWF)

References

External links
 

Dry forests
Tropical and subtropical dry broadleaf forests
Forests of Hawaii
Oceanian ecoregions
.
.
.
.
.
.